Joachim Hagenauer (born 29 July 1941) is an information theorist and professor emeritus at Technical University of Munich. He pioneered the use of soft bits (see Soft output Viterbi algorithm), a coding theory technique that contributes to the high performance of the turbo codes.

Professor Hagenauer's work enabled the advancement of turbo coding and led to a significant improvement in channel coding for digital communications and storage. His works have been applied to digital receiver designs, satellite transmissions and other facets of telecommunications.

Hagenauer received his doctorate in 1974 from Darmstadt University of Technology where he also served as an assistant professor. In 1990 he was appointed a director of the Institute for Communication Technology at the German Aerospace Center DLR in Oberpfaffenhofen. In 1993 he became the Chair of the University of Technology's Communications Technology department in Munich, Germany.

He was also active at the IEEE Information Theory Society.

He has been awarded the Erich Regener and Otto Lilienthal Prizes from the German Aerospace Association, and the Armstrong Award from the IEEE Communications Society, and was also elected to the Bavarian Academy of Science. In 2003, he received the IEEE Alexander Graham Bell Medal for meritorious achievements in telecommunications.

See also 
 Google scholar profile

References

External links 

 Engineering & Technology History - Joachim Hagenauer
 

 IEEE. IEEE Alexander Graham Bell Medal Recipients: 2003 - Joachim Hagenauer (biography), Institute of Electrical and Electronics Engineers (IEEE) website. Retrieved May 2010.

Living people
1941 births
German information theorists
Academic staff of the Technical University of Munich

Academic staff of Technische Universität Darmstadt
Technische Universität Darmstadt alumni